Swami Vivekananda Airport  (referred as VARP until February 2018), formerly known as Mana Airport, is a domestic airport serving the state of Chhattisgarh, India. It is the busiest airport in Central India and the busiest in Chhattisgarh. It is the 26th busiest airport in India by passenger traffic.

On 24 January 2012, the airport was renamed after Swami Vivekananda, as a tribute to the popular saint who spent a major part of his life in Raipur.

Airfield
As of Feb 2022 the state government is yet to transfer the land.

The airfield is equipped with night landing facilities such as CAT-1 instrument landing system (ILS) at Runway 24, and navigational aids such as ADS-B, DVOR, DME, NDB, and PAPI.

The apron has six parking bays which can accommodate A320/B737 category of aircraft and a helipad (Works to accommodate a 7th A320/B737 category aircraft on the apron are underway). The airport is equipped with category VI firefighting and rescue capability with provisions for category VII on demand.

which made emergency landing in September 2015 is lying at Raipur Airport as of November 2022]]

Terminals

New integrated terminal
The new integrated terminal was inaugurated on 7 November 2012 by then President of India Pranab Mukherjee. It is designed to handle 1300 passengers at a time, including 400 international passengers.

The new terminal has three aero-bridges, eight boarding gates, twenty check-in counters, eight X-ray baggage machines, four security counters, and two conveyor belts for luggage. Construction for fourth aero-bridge is under-consideration.

Cargo terminal
The Common User Domestic Cargo Terminal (CUDCT) was inaugurated on 4 June 2016, fulfilling the long pending demand of the state to start air cargo operations. The AAI has converted the old terminal building into CUDCT to handle cargo operations. Ahmedabad based GSEC Limited has bagged the contract to operate and maintain the CUDCT for an initial period of five years.

Airlines and destinations

Statistics

Connectivity
It is well connected by Raipur and Naya Raipur BRTS and cabs such as Ola and Uber. In addition, the Raipur Urban Public Transport Society operates direct air-conditioned city buses to the neighbouring cities of Bhilai and Durg, via Raipur.

Gallery

See also
 Bilasa Devi Kevat Airport, Bilaspur
 Jagdalpur Airport
 Ambikapur Airport
 List of airports in India
 List of the busiest airports in India

References

External links

Raipur Airport - India Airport Global Website
International Airport
Raipur Airport at AAI

Change of ICAO code from VARP to VERP

Buildings and structures in Raipur, Chhattisgarh
Airports in Chhattisgarh
International airports in India
Transport in Raipur, Chhattisgarh
Airports with year of establishment missing